Daniels Motor Company was a pioneer brass era American automobile company, founded in 1915 by George E. Daniels (formerly of GM AND Buick) with Neff E. Parish. George Daniels was a known lawyer, engineer, and mechanic. He was considered the best motorcar designer in the United States. Neff Parish had his own automobile parts and framing manufacturing company. Neff was the creator of the time's highest-grade heat-treated alloy steel frames, respected in the steel industry. Daniels Motor Company produced 1,500 high-quality automobiles between 1916 and 1924, branding themselves as “the distinguished car with just a little more power than you will ever need”, and “The aristocrat of American cars”.

No stock models were created. Daniels cars were built to be permanent personal pieces of art. Each car fabricated was crafted for the individual buyer. With custom coachwork, the Daniels was a bespoke car, built to order, offering a proprietary narrow-angle V8 as standard equipment, for a price (in 1922) of US$7,450. By contrast, the 1913 Lozier Big Six limousines and landaulettes were US$6,500, tourers and roadsters US$5,000; the Lozier Light Six Metropolitan tourer and runabout started at US$3,250; Americans ran from US$525 down to US$4250; the Enger 40 was US$2000, the FAL US$1750, the Oakland 40 US$1600, and both the Cole 30 US$1500, and Colt Runabout  were US$1500. Below that, presumably, a Daniels customer would not have looked.

Beginning 

In 1916, Daniels Motor Company produced 142 Model A Daniels Eight Cylinder cars with several body styles from its Reading, Pennsylvania, manufacturing plant. As Daniels did all of its own production, the company never had to refuse buyers due to high demand unlike competitors. In 1917, the three passenger Coupe Model B was produced. Prices ranged from $3,100 to $5,200. 
In 1919, between one hundred and two hundred Cloverleaf Coupe model Cs were produced.  This model displayed the first Daniels-built engine. The engine, designed by the same Italian engineer who created the best four-cylinder engines in Europe, proved inadequate and had to be reconfigured.

1920s 

In 1920, Daniels announced it would be opening a new plant in Philadelphia, Pennsylvania, and premiered the V8 engine. Production was expected to be 1,500 automobiles annually at the new facility. Seven different body styles were available with V8 engines, with designs ranging from the seven-passenger touring cars priced $4,750 to the Daniels limousine at $6,250. In 1921, prices increased and existing models experienced moderate design changes.
In 1922, the Daniels Motor Company opened a new office in Brooklyn, New York, intended to serve Brooklyn and Long Island residents and announced the plan to double output of all Daniels' plants within two months' time. This office was the first Daniels to offer a service station to all Daniels Motor Company buyers with Daniels Motor Company-specific tools and equipment. George Daniels cited providing service stations as the most important facet of his business structure, as it was a major driver of sales. In its prime, Daniels Motor Company had between 15 and 20 agents across the US. That same year, Daniels released a statement explaining the company would be cutting prices for the first time. The president warned buyers no further reductions were expected and prices are to rise again within 90 days. At the same time, a majority of the company's preferred stock was offered on the New York Stock Exchange.

Financial crisis 

In 1923, the company underwent “unusual” procedures to take back its declaration of dividends. A series of internal business problems lead to the initial breakdown of the company. A federal judge rejected an offer of $84,271 made for assets of Daniels Motor Company at public auction for the company's Reading plant. The auction was held by the company's receivers of equity under adherence of the US court system. The courts told receivers they could apply later for a re-sale after they have considered two proposals made in court. First, the president asked for two weeks to develop a reorganization plan. Second, one bidder offered to buy the land for $110,000. The second option fell through when the court found the proposal inadequate. 
In 1924, as a last-ditch effort to save the business, the company announced its line of products would begin to be sold at higher prices in order to make a profit. Additionally, it was announced the moving of its company headquarters from Reading to Philadelphia. Later in 1924, anyone holding claims against the “defunct” Daniels Motor Company were notified to present their claims to the Philadelphia court district who has appointed a special master dedicated to passing the final accounts of the corporation.

In a statement from the company:

The corporation was sold by the order of the district court. One hundred people attended the public auction and six bids were made. George Billman, a real estate dealer, bought the Reading plant property. The property was estimated to be worth $300,000. George Nagle purchased the name, trademarks, and drawings for $1,900. Levene Motor Company of Philadelphia acquired the assets of Daniels Motor Company. The company paid $90,000, $50,000 subject to mortgage. The company planned to invest $20,000 in improvements to convert the plan to a warehouse and manufacturing facility for their own purposes.

Post operation 

In 1953, a 32-year-old Daniels 1921 model D car was up for auction in California. The original cost was $6,500.  It was believed to be the last existing 1921 Daniels Model D in existence, and one of fifteen remaining Daniels cars in the world.
Chassis numbers
1915 101-108 Model A Herschell Spillman engine
1916 109-250 Model A Herschell Spillman engine
1917 251-400 Model A Herschell Spillman engine
1918 401-?   Model B Herschell Spillman engine
1919 601-?
1920 ?-1350
1921 1351-1769
1922 1838-2087
1923 2089-?

See also
List of automobile manufacturers
List of defunct automobile manufacturers

References

Sources
Clymer, Floyd. Treasury of Early American Automobiles, 1877-1925. New York: Bonanza Books, 1950.

Defunct motor vehicle manufacturers of the United States
Motor vehicle manufacturers based in Pennsylvania
1920s cars
Companies based in Reading
Vehicle manufacturing companies established in 1916
Luxury motor vehicle manufacturers
Defunct manufacturing companies based in Pennsylvania